Zero-db is an English music duo composed by Chris Vogado and Neil Combstock, whose specialty is trip hop, jazz and fusion music. They signed a record contract with Ninja Tune and are associated with artists like Mr Scruff and the Herbaliser. They began producing music in 2000, when they released their first album, EP Come Party. The artists' popularity increased as the group Zero-db toured across Asia, America and Europe.

Discography
Come Party (2000)
Bongos, Bleeps and Basslines (2006)
Heavyweight Gringos LP (2008)

References

External links

English jazz ensembles
Ninja Tune artists
Jazz fusion ensembles
Trip hop groups
Musical groups established in 2000